Laelioproctis is a genus of moths in the subfamily Lymantriinae. The genus was described by Hering in 1926.

Species
Laelioproctis leucosphena Collenette, 1939 south-western Africa
Laelioproctis taeniosoma Hering, 1926 Togo
Laelioproctis thysanota Collenette, 1960 Kenya

References

Lymantriinae